Coventry Godiva Harriers (CGH) is an athletics club based in Coventry, West Midlands, England and was established in 1879. The club name refers to the notable Lady Godiva of Coventry and the sport of "hare and hounds" cross country running.

Competitions 
The club currently competes in various league competitions, ranging from the senior age group down to under 11s. These leagues and the club's most recent 2018/19 performance are listed below:

Notable athletes 

The club has produced many athletes who have competed at an international level, including the Olympics and Commonwealth Games. The list below shows some of the most recognised athletes along with their event and performance whilst competing at the highest level.

More recently the club has had several athletes compete in World Masters Athletics competitions, notable sprinters Brian Darby and Stewart Marshall have both won World Relay Titles representing GB as Masters athletes, at the recent World Masters Athletics Championships.

References

External links
 Coventry Godiva Harriers

Sport in Coventry
Sports clubs established in 1879
Athletics clubs in England
1879 establishments in England